The Mexican Geological Society (in Spanish: Sociedad Geológica Mexicana) is a Mexican learned society founded in 1904.  Among the founders was geologist Dr. José G. Aguilera who also was the first president of the society.  The society publishes the journal Boletín de la Sociedad Geológica Mexicana.

References

External links 

Geology societies
Geology of Mexico
Scientific organizations based in Mexico